Rear Moth is the second EP released by electronica duo Psapp.

Track listing

Personnel

Psapp

Carim Clasmann
Galia Durant

Additional personnel

Shawn Lee - vocals, "Grand Opening"

Notes
"Grand Opening" and "Do Something Wrong" were later released on Early Cats and Tracks.
"Whores" was later released on Early Cats and Tracks Volume 2.
A song entitled "Rear Moth" would appear later in 2004 on Psapp's Tiger, My Friend.

External links
Psapp official website 
Psapp at Domino Records

Psapp albums
2004 EPs